Lesticus waterhousei is a species of ground beetle in the subfamily Pterostichinae. It was described by Maximilien Chaudoir in 1862.

References

Lesticus
Beetles described in 1862